Barbara Stephens (August 30, 1922 – July 31, 1947) was an American journalist who died in a mysterious plane crash in Xinjiang province, China in 1947. Stephens was investigating the Kuomintang treatment of ethnic minorities in the province when in 1947 she traveled to Ili to report on the Soviet-backed Second East Turkestan Republic. That year she was killed in the plane crash on a flight from Xinjiang to Beijing that also took the life of a Chinese general and the son of a British member of Parliament.

Life

She was born Barbara Ellen Beerbower on August 30, 1922, in Yonkers, New York, to Louis Dumont Beerbower and Margaret Stephens.

After her parents' divorce, she changed her name to Stephens, her mother's maiden name. Her family relocated to Arlington County, Virginia in the Washington, D.C. area. She attended the University of Alabama for a year, then transferred to Barnard College in New York City, from where she graduated. After college, she took an overseas assignment with the United States Office of War Information (O.W.I.), and was stationed in Chungking.

While in Chungking, she became good friends with, among others, Graham Peck and Christopher Rand, later a China correspondent for the New York Herald Tribune.

She appeared in the November 5, 1945, issue of Life magazine ("Life Goes on a Date in Chungking").

At war's end, she resigned from OWI and worked briefly as a stringer for Agence France-Presse, filing dispatches on the Chinese Civil War from her post in Beijing (Peiping). In late 1946 she journeyed overland to Xinjiang (Sinkiang) to obtain facts about Kuomintang treatment of ethnic minorities in the province.

She was carrying the dossier of her lengthy investigation when the plane crashed.

Her remains were recovered several weeks after the crash and interred on December 22, 1947, in a courtyard of the American embassy at Nanking. Ambassador John Leighton Stuart presided at her funeral service.

According to Peter Rand, the "translated inscription" on the grave marker reads:

You died and went back to the place
Where you are from
But we are still here in this bloody,
Crazy, unlucky world.
But as you know we will fight
Forever without hesitation.
We will never give up, and will
Still drink vodka, and laugh loudly.
Go my dear child without worry.
You will still be alive in our hearts.

Popular culture
The character of "Alice James" in the historical novel Flash House by Aimee Liu is reportedly based on Stephens.

References

Further reading
 Peter Rand, China Hands'', Chapter 4: Alive in Our Hearts, Simon & Schuster (1995).

1922 births
1947 deaths
American reporters and correspondents
American women journalists
Women war correspondents
Time (magazine) people
People of the Chinese Civil War
Journalists killed while covering military conflicts
Victims of aviation accidents or incidents in China
20th-century American women writers
20th-century American writers
20th-century American journalists
Barnard College alumni
People of the United States Office of War Information